The Center Wheeling Market is a historic public market located along Market Street between 22nd and 23rd Streets in Wheeling, Ohio County, West Virginia.  It consists of the Center Wheeling Market building as well as the Center Wheeling Fish Market. The 1853 Center Wheeling Market building was designed by architect Thomas Pope as an open market. The building is of neo-classical style with three bays and structural cast iron Doric order columns. It has a gable roof and features a belfry complete with bell.  The 1890 open brick, neo-Romanesque section was designed by Wheeling architect Edward B. Franzheim.  It has brick piers that support a hipped roof with cross gables and a three-foot overhang.  In 1900, a wooden enclosure was built at the northern bay to house the Center Wheeling Fish Market.

It was listed on the National Register of Historic Places for Ohio County on February 20, 1975. The property is also located in the Centre Market Square Historic District.

Gallery

References

External links

Buildings and structures in Wheeling, West Virginia
Commercial buildings on the National Register of Historic Places in West Virginia
Neoclassical architecture in West Virginia
Romanesque Revival architecture in West Virginia
Commercial buildings completed in 1853
Historic American Engineering Record in West Virginia
National Register of Historic Places in Wheeling, West Virginia
1853 establishments in Virginia